Hayden Pass is a mountain pass in Colorado over the Sangre de Cristo Range. It is traversed by a jeep trail that starts, at the west end, at Villa Grove, Colorado and, at the east end, at Coaldale, Colorado. The Hayden Creek drainage, on the east side of the pass, was the site of the Hayden Pass Fire.

References

Mountain passes of Colorado
Landforms of Saguache County, Colorado
Landforms of Fremont County, Colorado
Transportation in Fremont County, Colorado
Transportation in Saguache County, Colorado